Jan Mandel is a Czech-American mathematician. He received his PhD from the Faculty of Mathematics and Physics, Charles University in Prague and was a Senior Research Scientist there. Since 1986, he is professor of Mathematics at the University of Colorado Denver. Since 2013, he is senior scientist at the Institute of Computer Science of the Czech Academy of Sciences.

He has worked in the field of multigrid methods and domain decomposition methods. He developed the balancing domain decomposition method and, with coauthors, published the convergence proofs of the FETI, FETI-DP, and BDDC methods, and the proof of the equivalence of the FETI-DP and the BDDC methods. He has been involved in the field of dynamic data driven application systems and data assimilation with applications in wildfire and epidemic modeling. He has contributed to the WRF-Fire software.

References

External links

Home page at University of Colorado Denver

20th-century American mathematicians
21st-century American mathematicians
Czech mathematicians
Living people
University of Colorado Denver faculty
Charles University alumni
Year of birth missing (living people)